Senai International Airport, formerly known as Sultan Ismail International Airport  is an international airport in the town of Senai, Kulai District, Johor, Malaysia, serving Johor Bahru and the southernmost region of Peninsular Malaysia. The airport is located approximately 32 km north-west of the Johor Bahru city centre.

History

Opened in 1974, the airport is managed and operated by Senai Airport Terminal Services Sdn Bhd (SATSSB) which took over the operations from Malaysia Airports Holdings Berhad (MAHB) in 2003 under a 50-year concession to develop the airport. SATSSB is currently wholly owned by MMC Corporation Berhad. Senai International Airport is currently the only privately managed public airport in Malaysia. SATSSB also operates Kerteh Airport for Petronas.

Senai International Airport is capable of handling up to 4.5 million passengers and 80,000 tonnes of cargo per annum.

Senai International Airport serves as the aviation gateway for Iskandar Malaysia and southern region, and is dedicated to providing routes and services essential to cater the needs of both tourism and business travelers. Equipped with a 3,800-metre Category 4E runway, Senai International Airport can handle aircraft up to large jets such as the Airbus A350 XWB, the Boeing 777 and even the Antonov An-124 Ruslan freighter. Currently, there are four airlines operating in Senai International Airport, serving 12 domestic and 4 international destinations.

In 2019, Senai International Airport handled a total of 4,254,922 passengers and 15,010 tons of freight with a combination of 52,030 scheduled and non-scheduled commercial aircraft movements. Currently the terminal is being expanded to handle 5 million passengers by 2023.

Airlines and destinations

Passenger

Traffic and statistics

Ground transport
Senai International Airport is connected to PLUS Highway, Senai–Desaru Expressway and Second Link Expressway. Taxis are available outside the airport. Buses to the city centre with the option to transit to Singapore are available.

Causeway Link provides the commuters a route to JB Sentral.

Senai Business Aviation Terminal (SBAT) 
SATSSB also operates SBAT, a private aviation terminal located just beside the airport's main terminal building and sharing the same infrastructure. True to its name, SBAT features business facilities including meeting and conference rooms, and dining and private rest facilities.

Senai Airport Free Industrial Zone (SAFIZ) 
SAFIZ forms part of Senai International Airport's total land area and operates as a free industrial zone for several multinational factories and distribution hubs, including Pokka, Celestica and BMW.

References

External links

 Senai International Airport, official site
 
 

South Johor Economic Region
1974 establishments in Malaysia
Airports established in 1974
Airports in Johor
Kulai District